Shar Pei fever (also called familial Shar Pei fever or FSF) is a condition seen in Shar Pei characterized by recurring fever and swelling of the hocks.  It is similar to familial Mediterranean fever in humans.  The cause is unknown, but it is thought to be inherited.  Shar Pei fever can result in renal and liver failure through accumulation of amyloid in those organs (amyloidosis).

Affected Shar Pei have an elevated level of interleukin 6, and this leads to an accumulation of acute phase proteins in the body during the fevers.  The acute phase proteins are broken down to form type AA amyloid, which deposits in the kidneys and less so in the liver, spleen, and gastrointestinal tract.  This eventually leads to kidney or liver failure by the age of six years.

The symptoms of Shar Pei fever include fever, swelling, and pain in the hocks that usually resolves within two days. The swelling in the hocks is easily recognizable—the hock will resemble a flaccid waterballoon, rather than stiff swelling following a sprain or break. The symptoms can be treated with NSAIDs such as carprofen.  Kidney and liver failure cannot be treated except by the conventional manner usually used for those diseases.  Prevention of amyloidosis is sometimes used in dogs with recurring episodes of Shar Pei fever.  Colchicine and dimethyl sulfoxide are most commonly used.  Dogs taking colchicine must be monitored closely for signs of bone marrow disease.  The prognosis is guarded for Shar Pei that develop amyloidosis.

References 

  

Dog diseases